Sweden has participated in the biennial classical music competition Eurovision Young Musicians 13 times since its debut in 1986, winning the contest for the first time in 2006. Sweden are yet to host the contest.

The nations were represented individually, following the introduction of a preliminary round, at the 1986 contest.

Participation overview

See also
Sweden in the Eurovision Song Contest
Sweden in the Eurovision Dance Contest
Sweden in the Eurovision Young Dancers
Sweden in the Junior Eurovision Song Contest

Notes

References

External links
 Eurovision Young Musicians

Countries in the Eurovision Young Musicians